Nicolas-Auguste Galimard (1813 Paris – 1880 Montigny-lès-Cormeilles) was a French historical, portrait and landscape painter.

Studies
Galimard studied under his uncle, Auguste Hesse, and with Ingres, and soon became known for his pictures, chiefly of Biblical subjects.

First works
His first exhibition was at the Paris Salon of 1835, when he presented his painting of The Three Marys At The Tomb and of a Lady of the Fifteenth Century Galimard was just 22 years old and would continue to display works at the Salon until 1880.

Critics, stained glass and other works

In 1855 at the Exposition Universelle Galimard's work on The Seduction of Leda was considered improper and rejected, however Napoleon III bought it and gave it to William I of Württemberg.

Galimard painted the Disciples at Emmaus for Saint-Germain l'Auxerrois, and mural decorations in the St. Germain-des-Prés, Paris. His picture of The Ode, exhibited at the Salon in 1846, is now in the Luxembourg Gallery. Many of Galimard's works have been engraved by Aubry-Lecomte and others. He made several designs for stained-glass windows, and wrote treatises on the subject.

The secret art critic
Numerous articles were published by Galimard as an art critic  using the names Judex, Dicastès and Richter in journals of the time like Gazette des Beaux-Arts, The Artist and La Patrie.

References

External links
 

1813 births
1880 deaths
19th-century French painters
French male painters
Painters from Paris
19th-century French male artists